Tropidodexia is a genus of parasitic flies in the family Tachinidae. There are at least two described species in Tropidodexia.

Species
Tropidodexia coracina (Wulp, 1891)
Tropidodexia lutzi Townsend, 1915

References

Dexiinae
Diptera of South America
Tachinidae genera
Taxa named by Charles Henry Tyler Townsend